Both of the Georgia incumbents were re-elected.

See also 
 List of United States representatives from Georgia

1800
Georgia
United States House of Representatives